Minamoto no Saneakira (Japanese: 源 信明) (910–970) was a middle Heian waka poet and nobleman. Along with his father Minamoto no Kintada he was designated a member of the Thirty-six Poetry Immortals.

Kintada's poems are included in imperial poetry anthologies from the Goshūi Wakashū onward. A personal collection known as the Saneakirashū (信明集) also remains.

External links 
E-text of his poems in Japanese

910 births
970 deaths
Minamoto clan
10th-century Japanese poets